CSU Neptun Constanţa, formerly known as CS Tomis Constanţa, is a women's handball club from Constanţa, Romania.

Kits

Honours

EHF Challenge Cup:                           
Runners-Up (1): 2006
Liga Naţională:
Runners-Up (1): 1978
Cupa României:
Runners-Up (1): 1978

Notable coaches

 Traian Bucovală
 Dumitru Muşi
 Lucian Rîşniţă
 Codruț Hanganu
 Rodica Pantea
 Elena Frîncu
 Cristian Barbulescu

Notable players

 Elena Frîncu
 Elisabeta Roşu
 Simona Manea
 Corina Şchiopu
 Ramona Mihalache
 Mihaela Ignat
 Mădălina Simule-Straton
 Amelia Busuioceanu
 Ionela Stanca
 Cristina Zamfir
 Bianca Tiron
 Diana Petrescu

External links
 
 

Romanian handball clubs
Handball clubs established in 1975
1975 establishments in Romania
Sport in Constanța
Liga Națională (women's handball)
Women's handball clubs